Thomas Edward Hughes (September 13, 1934 – November 2, 2019) was an American professional baseball player who appeared in two games for the  St. Louis Cardinals of Major League Baseball. He signed with the Cardinals in 1954.

As a minor league pitcher, Hughes posted gaudy win–loss records during his early career, winning 52 of 68 decisions (.765) between 1955 and 1957 for teams in the Class C California League and the Double-A Texas League. He led the California League in strikeouts with 273 and won 20 games during 1955. But he was treated late in 1956 for elbow soreness, then missed the entire 1958 campaign and almost all of 1959 while serving in the United States Army.

Upon his discharge in August 1959, Hughes was added to the Cardinals' expanded roster that September. With the Redbirds languishing in the second division, manager Solly Hemus gave the rookie two auditions as a starting pitcher, with both games against the Chicago Cubs. On September 13, his 25th birthday, at Wrigley Field, Hughes lasted into the third inning, but allowed five earned runs on five hits (including home runs by Ernie Banks and Irv Noren) and two bases on balls, and was tagged with the 8–0 defeat. Eight days later, at Busch Stadium, Hughes retired only four batters, and was charged with surrendering four hits and four earned runs. He again was charged with a loss, as Chicago went on to win, 12–3.

In 1960, Hughes returned to the minor leagues and spent two more seasons in the Cardinal organization before retiring from pro baseball. In his two MLB games, he allowed a total of nine hits and nine earned runs in four full innings pitched, for an earned run average of 15.75. He struck out two and issued two bases on balls.

References

External links

1934 births
2019 deaths
American expatriate baseball players in Panama
Ardmore Cardinals players
Fresno Cardinals players
Houston Buffaloes players
Houston Buffs players
Lancaster Red Roses players
Major League Baseball pitchers
Major League Baseball players from Panama
Memphis Chickasaws players
People from Panamá District
St. Louis Cardinals players
Tulsa Oilers (baseball) players
Zonians